The Kanaris family is a prominent family of sailors, politicians and soldiers from the island of Psara in Greece. The most important member of this family was the Greek admiral and statesman Konstantinos Kanaris.

Members 
Members of this family include:

 Mikes Kanaris, sailor and elder in Psara

 George Kanaris, naval officer and son of Mikes
 Konstantinos Kanaris, hero of the Greek War of Independence, admiral, Prime Minister and son of Mikes

 Nikolaos Kanaris, diplomat, Member of Parliament and son of Konstantinos
 Themistoklis Kanaris, army officer and son of Konstantinos
 Thrasyvoulos Kanaris, lieutenant and son of Konstantinos
 Miltiadis Kanaris, admiral, Member of Parliament, minister and son of Konstantinos

 Konstantinos Kanaris, naval officer and son of Miltiadis
 Leonidas Kanaris, lieutenant and son of Miltiadis
 Epaminondas Kanaris, Member of Parliament and son of Miltiadis
 Alexandros Kanaris, Member of Parliament, minister and son of Miltiadis
 Aristidis Kanaris, lieutenant general, and son of Miltiadis

 Maria Kanaris, wife of A. Balabano and daughter of Konstantinos
 Lykourgos Kanaris, naval officer, lawyer and son of Konstantinos

 Athena Kanaris, wife of Pierre-André Mihière and daughter of Lykourgos

 Napoleon Kanaris, Member of Parliament and son of Lykourgos

 Maria Kanaris, daughter of Napoleon

 Erasmia Kanaris, wife of Georgios Botasis and daughter of Maria

 Aristeidis Kanaris, army officer and son of Konstantinos

 Themistoklis Kanaris, consul, Member of Parliament, collaborator of Charilaos Trikoupis and son of Aristeidis
 Ioannis Kanaris, Member of Parliament and son of Aristeidis

See also 
 List of political families in Greece
 List of prime ministers of Greece

References